Don Camillo in Moscow ("Comrade Don Camillo"; , "Don Camillo in Russia") is a 1965 Italian comedy film directed by Luigi Comencini. It was the fifth film in the Don Camillo series.

Plot
After receiving a tractor as a gift from the collective farm (kolkhoz) of a Soviet village on the Don River, Communist mayor Peppone plans to twin Brescello with the unnamed village. After some failed attempts to block the mayor's plan, the anti-Communist Don Camillo ultimately tricks Peppone into including him (under a false name and with forged papers) among the Italian Communist representatives passing through the Iron Curtain to attend the twinning ceremonies. Only Peppone and the other comrades from Brescello know the priest's real identity. During the Russian stay, they face a series of situations that will show them both the political contradictions of Soviet Russia and the normal life of its common people.

Cast
Fernandel ...  Don Camillo
Gino Cervi ...  Giuseppe 'Peppone' Bottazzi
Leda Gloria ...  Maria Bottazzi
Gianni Garko ...  Scamoggia
Saro Urzì ...  Brusco
Graziella Granata ...  Nadia
Paul Muller ...  Le pope
Marco Tulli ...  Smilzo
Jacques Herlin ...  Perletti
Silla Bettini ...  Bigio
Aldo Vasco ...  Un camarade
Alessandro Gottlieb ...  Ivan
Mirko Valentin ...  Le faux russe
Ettore Geri ...  Oregov
Margherita Sala ...  La femme d'Ivan

External links

References

1965 films
1965 comedy films
Cold War films
Films about Catholic priests
Films based on works by Giovannino Guareschi
Films critical of communism
Films directed by Luigi Comencini
Films set in Italy
Films set in Emilia-Romagna
Films set in the Soviet Union
French comedy films
French political satire films
French satirical films
Italian comedy films
Italian satirical films
Italian political satire films
1960s Italian-language films
Films scored by Alessandro Cicognini
1960s Italian films
1960s French films